James Sykes (1725 – April 4, 1792) was an American lawyer and politician from Dover, in Kent County, Delaware. He served in the Delaware General Assembly and was a Continental Congressman from Delaware.

Early life and family
Sykes was born in 1725, probably in New Castle, Delaware. He married Agnes Bell and had eight children: James, Stephen, George, Nathaniel, Ann, Harriet, Lucy Matilda, and Mary. They lived in Dover, Delaware and were members of Christ Episcopal Church.

Political career
Sykes served as a lieutenant under Caesar Rodney in the Dover Militia in 1756. In 1776 he was a delegate to the Delaware State Constitutional Convention held at Dover. From November 7, 1776 until January 10, 1777 Sykes served on the Council of Safety, a body which was appointed to act as the state's executive until the Delaware General Assembly was able to choose the state's first President and Privy Council. He served in the Continental Congress most of  1777. Also in 1777, Sykes was appointed Kent County Clerk of the Peace and Kent County Prothonotary. He served in these posts for the remainder of his life. Sykes served on the state's Privy Council in 1780, and in the state's second Constitutional Convention in 1792 until his death. He was appointed Judge of the High Court of Errors and Appeals of Delaware in 1792 and served until his death later that year.

Death and legacy
Sykes died in Dover, Delaware on April 4, 1792 and is buried at Christ Episcopal Church there. His son, James Sykes Jr., served as Governor of Delaware, and his great-grandson George served as a Major General in the American Civil War.

Almanac
From 1776 until 1792 Delaware elections were held on the first day of October of the year noted. Terms for members of the General Assembly began on the twentieth day of October. Members of the Legislative Council had a term of three years. Three State Councilmen were elected, at large, from each county.

References

External links
Delaware History.
The Political Graveyard .
 
Ratification of the Constitution by the State of Delaware; December 7, 1787.

Places with more information
Delaware Historical Society website; 505 North Market Street, Wilmington, Delaware 19801; (302) 655-7161
University of Delaware Library website, 181 South College Avenue, Newark, Delaware 19717; (302) 831–2965

1725 births
1792 deaths
18th-century American Episcopalians
Continental Congressmen from Delaware
18th-century American politicians
Delaware state senators
People from Dover, Delaware
People from New Castle, Delaware